John Romer was the former officiating governor of Bombay during the British Raj from 17 January 1831 to 21 March 1831.

References
  

Governors of Bombay
Year of birth missing
Year of death missing